Amanda Mike-Ebeye (born 30 April 1986) is a Nigerian actress and a part-time model. She is known for her roles in Clinic Matters and Super Story.

Career
She made her film debut in Weeping Tiger (2008).

In a 2013 interview documented by Information Nigeria, Ebeye revealed that as a professional actress, she can go unclad on set for $50 million.

Personal life 
Ebeye is from the Agbor tribe of Delta State. She is a graduate of International Studies and Diplomacy from Benson Idahosa University. In 2016, she delivered a son in Canada.

The Authority revealed that Ebeye disclosed in an Instagram post that initially she wasn't looking forward to the idea of having her own kids, but since she gave birth to her son she appreciates God for blessing her with him. In 2016, Ebeye's mother remarried. She is of the opinion that pastors should stop deceiving people.

Filmography
 Tongue (2010)
 Burning Tears (2009)
 Heat of the Moment (2009)
 Clinic Matter (2009)
 Dangerous Angels as Carol
 The Pastor's Daughter
 Desire
 My Last Wedding
 100% Secret (2012)
 Weeping Tiger
 Within Tiger
 Keep my Love
 Super Story (More than a friend, 2008)
 Super Story (Blast from past, 2007)
 It's Her Day 
 Tales of Women
 The Evil Seed
 Agwonma: The Unbreakable Egg
 Sorrowful Heart (with Ebube Nwagbo and Yul Edochie)
 Everyday People (TV series)
 Indecent Lover (Film)

Awards and nominations

References

External links

Actresses from Delta State
Nigerian female models
Nigerian film actresses
21st-century Nigerian actresses
Benson Idahosa University alumni
1986 births
Living people